The Szolnoki Repülőmúzeum ("Airplane Museum of Szolnok") is a large museum displaying old military and civilian aircraft and aircraft engines in Szolnok, Hungary. It was located next to the "Lt. Ittebei Kiss József" Helicopter Base of the Hungarian Air Force; the collection (or part of it) has now moved to premises in the city centre, under the new name of Reptár.

History
The museum started out as the aircraft and technical peripherals collection of the "Kilián György Flight Technical College" in 1973. Since then many things changed but the collection remained, growing always bigger. Originally the museum focused on military aviation but later civil and utility aircraft were introduced to the collection which is divided into two: the open air part, and a separate indoor area with weaponry, uniforms and photographic collections. The museum also stores the remains of a number of Second World War warplanes shot down over Hungary and it plays a leading role in salvaging and conservation of such wrecks. As result of these efforts the museum recovered an Il-2, two Bf 109s and a LaGG-5. The collection also included a Lisunov Li-2 which was since restored to airworthy condition, thus becoming the only airworthy exemplar of the kind.

Collection

Fixed-wing motorized aircraft

 Aeronautika Denevér (eng. mean.:"bat", the first, and only complete fully Hungarian-made UAV)
 Super Aero 45
 Aero L-29 Delfin
 Aero L-39 Albatros ZO
 Antonov An-2
 Antonov An-24

 Antonov An-26
 F-104 Starfighter (ex Turkish) 
 F-104 Starfighter (ex West German)
 Hawker Hunter Mk58, ex Patrouille Suisse
 Ilyushin Il-2 M3 (wreck from the Lake Balaton
 Ilyushin Il-14
 Ilyushin Il-18 V
 Ilyushin Il-28
 Let L-200A Morava
 Lisunov Li-2
 Mikoyan-Gurevich MiG-15 bis
 Mikoyan-Gurevich MiG-15 UTI
 Mikoyan-Gurevich MiG-17 PF
 Mikoyan-Gurevich MiG-19 PM
 Mikoyan-Gurevich MiG-21 F-13
 Mikoyan-Gurevich MiG-21 MF
 Mikoyan-Gurevich MiG-21 bis
 Mikoyan-Gurevich MiG-21 bisAP
 Mikoyan-Gurevich MiG-21 PF

 Mikoyan-Gurevich MiG-21 R
 Mikoyan-Gurevich MiG-21 U
 Mikoyan-Gurevich MiG-21 UM
 Mikoyan-Gurevich MiG-23 MF
 Mikoyan-Gurevich MiG-23 UB
 Messerschmitt Bf 108 Taifun got for the sold Yakovlev Yak-11 restored (now in the new hangar)
 Polikarpov Po-2 (now in the new hangar)
 Saab J 32E Lansen
 Saab JA 37DI Viggen
 Sukhoi Su-22 M3
 Tupolev Tu-134
 Tupolev Tu-154
 Yakovlev Yak-11 (Got from the Keceli haditechnikai park, now in the new hangar, and currently the only one in Hungary
 Yakovlev Yak-12 R (now in the new hangar)
 Yakovlev Yak-18 (now in the new hangar)
 Yakovlev Yak-52

Gliders
 R-16 Lepke
 R-26S Góbé

Helicopters

 Mil Mi-1 M
 Mil Mi-2
 Mil Mi-4 A
 Mil Mi-8 P
 Mil Mi-8 T
 Mil Mi-24 D
 Kamov Ka-26

Engines

 Avia M-462 RF
 BMW 801
 Daimler-Benz DB 605
 Fejes Jenő's experimental engine
 Isotov GTD-350
 Isotov TV2-117A
 Ivchenko AI-14R
 Ivchenko AI-26V
 Ivchenko AI-20M

 Ivchenko AI-24VT
 Ivchenko AI-25TL
 Klimov VK-1A
 Kuznetsov NK-8-2U
 Le Rhône 9J
 Mikulin AM-42
 Siemens-Halske Sh 4
 Shvetsov M-11FR
 Shvetsov AS-21
 Shvetsov AS-62 IR
 Shvetsov AS-82
 Tumansky RD-9B
 Tumansky R-11F-300
 Vedeneev M-14V-26
 Walter 6-III

Miscellaneous

 A unique Fiat G.12 fuselage section
 Ejection seats
 Various onboard weapon systems
 Aerial photo reconnaissance cameras
 Radar systems

See also
List of aerospace museums

References

External links

 Museum of Hungarian Aviation

Buildings and structures in Szolnok
Aerospace museums in Hungary
Military and war museums in Hungary
Transport museums in Hungary
Museums in Jász-Nagykun-Szolnok County